Tichy District is a district of Béjaïa Province, Algeria.

Municipalities
The district is further divided into 3 municipalities:
Tichy
Boukhelifa
Tala Hamza

References

Districts of Béjaïa Province